Andrzej Stanisław Sośnierz (born 8 May 1951) is a Polish politician and physician and a current member of the Sejm.

Political career
He was elected to Sejm on 25 September 2005, getting 54,876 votes in Katowice, standing for Civic Platform. He left the party after criticising the leadership's negative attitude towards a potential coalition with Law and Justice (PiS). After being expelled, in January 2006, he joined PiS, for whom he ran in the 2007 election.  In 2010, he left PiS to join Poland Comes First, when that party was created. Elected in 2015 as a representative of Poland Together. Reelected in 2019.

On 22 June 2022 Sośnierz was thrown out of the Agreement Party after his parliamentary group "Polish Affairs" signed an agreement with Law and Justice. Sośnierz, along with Zbigniew Girzyński and leader of the group 
Agnieszka Ścigaj confirmed their participation in the ruling United Right coalition as independent MP's.

See also
Members of Polish Sejm 2005-2007

References

External links
Andrzej Sośnierz - parliamentary page - includes declarations of interest, voting record, and transcripts of speeches.

1951 births
Living people
People from Głuchołazy
Members of the Polish Sejm 2005–2007
Members of the Polish Sejm 2007–2011
Members of the Polish Sejm 2015–2019
Members of the Polish Sejm 2019–2023
Poland Comes First politicians
Law and Justice politicians
Civic Platform politicians
Solidarity (Polish trade union) activists